The 1985 Virginia Slims of Washington, also known as the VS of Washington, was a women's tennis tournament played on indoor carpet courts in Washington, D.C. in the United States that was part of the 1984 Virginia Slims World Championship Series. It was the 14th edition of the event and was played from January 7 through January 13, 1985. First-seeded Martina Navratilova won the singles title and $28,000 first-prize money.

Finals

Singles
 Martina Navratilova defeated  Manuela Maleeva 6–3, 6–2
 It was Navratilova's 1st singles title of the year and the 100th of her career.

Doubles
 Gigi Fernández /  Martina Navratilova defeated  Claudia Kohde-Kilsch /  Helena Suková 6–3, 3–6 6–3

Notes

References

External links
 ITF tournament edition details
 Tournament draws

Virginia Slims of Washington
Virginia Slims Of Washington, 1985
1985 in Washington, D.C.